West Parasery is a village situated in Kalkulam taluk of Kanyakumari district, Tamil Nadu, India. It is nearby Nagercoil  town.

References 

Villages in Kanyakumari district